James Leonard Peters  (born 1937) is a New Zealand educator and politician. Born in Kawakawa, he is of Ngāti Wai and Clan McInnes descent.

He went to school at Whananaki Primary and Wesley College in Auckland. Further education followed at the University of Auckland (BA in History and Political Studies) and Auckland Teachers Training College (Diploma of Teaching).

He is a member of the New Zealand First party, which is led by his younger brother Winston Peters. Jim Peters entered Parliament as a list MP in the 2002 election, having previously served as the Chairperson on the Northland Regional Council. Before entering politics he was a high school teacher. Formerly he was HOD History, Geography and Social Studies at Mount Albert Grammar School. From 1987 to mid-2002 he was Principal of Northland College in Kaikohe. He lost his list seat in the 2005 election after New Zealand First's share of the party vote declined from its 2002 result. He was appointed Deputy Vice-Chancellor (Maori) of the University of Auckland in 2006.

In February 2008 he could have re-entered Parliament as a New Zealand First list MP after the resignation of Brian Donnelly, but stood aside in favour of Dail Jones.

In the 2008 New Year Honours, Peters was appointed a Member of the New Zealand Order of Merit for services to local-body affairs, education, and the community.

Three members of his family, the others being his brothers Ian Peters and Winston Peters, have been Members of Parliament in New Zealand. Another brother, Ron Peters, stood for New Zealand First in Hobson in 1993, coming third; and for Northland in 1996, coming second.

References

1937 births
Living people
Local politicians in New Zealand
Māori MPs
New Zealand educators
New Zealand First MPs
People from the Bay of Islands
University of Auckland alumni
Academic staff of the University of Auckland
People educated at Wesley College, Auckland
New Zealand list MPs
Members of the New Zealand House of Representatives
Ngāti Wai people
People from Kawakawa, New Zealand
Unsuccessful candidates in the 2005 New Zealand general election
21st-century New Zealand politicians
Members of the New Zealand Order of Merit